Merthyr Tydfil County Borough is located in the historic county of Glamorgan in Wales and takes its name from its largest town. There are ten structures on the list of twelve Grade II* listed buildings in Merthyr Tydfil. Two viaducts constructed as part of the Brecon and Merthyr Railway both straddle the borders of neighbouring communities so have separate designations for each of these locations.

In the United Kingdom, the term listed building refers to a building or other structure officially designated as being of special architectural, historical, or cultural significance. Listing was begun by a provision in the Town and Country Planning Act 1947. Once a building is listed, strict limitations are imposed on the modifications allowed to its structure or fittings and alterations require listed building consent. In Wales, authority for listing or delisting, under the Planning (Listed Buildings and Conservation Areas) Act 1990, rests with the Welsh Ministers, though these decisions are based on the recommendations of Cadw. There are around 30,000 listed buildings in Wales and these are categorised into three grades: Grade I (one), II* (two star) and II (two). Grade II* denotes "particularly important buildings of more than special interest" and makes up about seven per cent of the total number of listed buildings in Wales.

At the beginning of the 19th century Merthyr Tydfil was the largest town in Glamorgan. The previous fifty years had seen the establishment of four major ironworks in the area, Dowlais, Plymouth, Cyfarthfa and Penydarren, and the Grade II* listed architecture of the region reflects the growth of this industry and transport network associated with it. The oldest structure, a bridge built in 1793, had a dual purpose as it carried a tramway and aqueducts powering the Cyfarthfa Ironworks. The growth of iron foundries in Merthyr Tydfil led to the building of the Glamorganshire Canal (17911795) connecting the industry to the docks at Cardiff. Within a decade the Merthyr Tramroad, a  route linking the Dowlais and Penydarren works to Abercynon, was built to bypass the upper section of the canal. Near Quakers Yard there are two Grade II* listed bridges (built 1815) that were part of the tramway and a viaduct, which passes over it, was built in 1841 as part of the Taff Vale Railway. The two viaducts of the Brecon and Merthyr Railway, built 1866, were designed by Henry Conybeare and Alexander Sutherland. Robert Crawshay of the Cyfarthfa Ironworks was a friend of Sutherland and the Crawshay Estate laid down conditions for the design of the Cefn viaduct, with the Taff Valley being overlooked by Cyfarthfa Castle. There are two Grade II* listed engine houses in the county, one built in 1836 at the Ynysfach Ironworks (operated as part of the Cyfarthfa complex), and the other in the early 20th century at the Dowlais Ironworks. In the first half of the 19th century Cyfarthfa was surpassed by Dowlais as the largest ironworks in the world. The only Grade II* listed building that was originally for recreational use, the former Guest Memorial Library, was built to commemorate the owner of the Dowlais Ironworks during this period, John Josiah Guest, who died in 1852. At this time the population of the town of Merthyr Tydfil was 46,000, twice that of Cardiff or Swansea, however it was not until 1894 that an urban district council was established. The Town Hall (189698) built as an expression of the civic pride of attaining urban status rapidly became the centre of civic and political focus in the town.

Buildings

|}

See also

 List of Scheduled Monuments in Merthyr Tydfil
 Grade I listed buildings in Merthyr Tydfil County Borough
 Registered historic parks and gardens in Merthyr Tydfil County Borough

Notes

References

Bibliography

 
Merthyr Tydfil County Borough II*